John of Worcester (died c. 1140) was an English monk and chronicler who worked at Worcester Priory. He is usually held to be the author of the Chronicon ex chronicis.

Chronicon ex chronicis
The Chronicon ex chronicis is a world wide history which begins with the creation and ends in 1140. The chronological framework of the Chronicon was presented by the chronicle of Marianus Scotus (d. 1082). A great deal of additional material, particularly relating to English history, was grafted onto it.

Authorship

The greater part of the work, up to 1117 or 1118, was formerly attributed to the man Florence of Worcester on the basis of the entry for his death under the annal of 1118, which credits his skill and industry for making the chronicle such a prominent work. In this view, the other Worcester monk, John, merely wrote the final part of the work. However, there are two main objections against the ascription to Florence. First, there is no change of style in the Chronicon after Florence's death, and second, certain sections before 1118 rely to some extent on the Historia novorum of Eadmer of Canterbury, which was completed sometime in 1121 – 1124.

The prevalent view today is that John of Worcester was the principal author and compiler. He is explicitly named as the author of two entries for 1128 and 1138, and two manuscripts (CCC MS 157 and the chronicula) were written in his hand. He was seen working on it at the behest of Wulfstan, bishop of Worcester, when the Anglo-Norman chronicler Orderic Vitalis visited Worcester:

{|
|Ioannes Wigornensis a puero monachus, natione Anglicus, moribus et eruditione uenerandus, in his quæ Mariani Scotti cronicis adiecit, de rege Guillelmo et de rebus quæ sub eo uel sub filiis eius Guillelmo Rufo et Henrico usque hodie contigerunt honeste deprompsit. [...] Quem prosecutus Iohannes acta fere centum annorum contexuit, iussuque uenerabilis Wlfstani pontificis et monachi supradictis cronicis inseruit in quibus multa de Romanis et Francis et Alemannis aliisque gentibus quæ agnouit [...].
|"John, an Englishman by birth who entered the monastery of Worcester as a boy and won great repute for his learning and piety, continued the chronicle of Marianus Scotus and carefully recorded the events of William's reign and of his sons William Rufus and Henry up to the present. [...] John, at the command of the venerable Wulfstan bishop and monk [d. 1095], added to these chronicles [i.e. of Marianus Scotus] events of about a hundred years, by inserting a brief and valuable summary of many deeds of the Romans and Franks, Germans and other peoples whom he knew [...]."
|}

Manuscripts
The Chronicon survives in five manuscripts (and a fragment on a single leaf):

MS 157 (Oxford, Corpus Christi College). The principal manuscript, working copy used by John.
MS 502 (Dublin, Trinity College).
MS 42 (Lambeth Palace Library).
MS Bodley 297 (Oxford, Bodleian Library).
MS 92 (Cambridge, Corpus Christi College).

In addition, there is the chronicula, a minor chronicle based on the Chronicon proper: MS 503 (Dublin, Trinity College), written by John up to 1123.

Sources for English history

For the body of material dealing with early English history, John is believed to have used a number of sources, some of which are now lost:

unknown version(s) of the Anglo-Saxon Chronicle, possibly in Latin translation. John may have shared a lost source with William of Malmesbury, whose Gesta regum anglorum includes similar material not found in other works.
Bede, Historia Ecclesiastica (up to 731)
Asser, Vita Ælfredi
Hagiographical works on tenth/eleventh-century saints
Lives of St Dunstan by author 'B', Adelard and Osbern
Byrhtferth, Life of St. Oswald
Osbern of Canterbury, Life of St Ælfheah
Eadmer of Canterbury, Historia novorum (1066–1122)
accounts by contemporaries and local knowledge.

Chronicon ex chronicis: editions and translations 
Darlington, Reginald R. and P. McGurk (eds.), P. McGurk and Jennifer Bray (trs.). The Chronicle of John of Worcester: The Annals from 450–1066. Vol 2. Oxford Medieval Texts. Oxford: 1995.
McGurk, P. (ed. and tr.). The Chronicle of John of Worcester: The Annals from 1067 to 1140 with The Gloucester Interpolations and The Continuation to 1141. Vol 3. OMT. Oxford, 1998.
Thorpe, Benjamin (ed.). Florentii Wigorniensis monachi chronicon ex chronicis. 2 vols. London, 1848-9. Download available from Google Books
Stevenson, J. (tr.). Church Historians of England. 8 vols: vol. 2.1. London, 1855. 171–372.
Forester, Thomas (tr.). The Chronicle of Florence of Worcester. London: Henry G. Bohn, 1854. Available from Google Books.
Weaver, J. R. H., ed. (1908) The Chronicle of John of Worcester, 1118–1140: being the continuation of the 'Chronicon ex chronicis' of Florence of Worcester. Oxford: Clarendon Press Edition on Archive.org

References

Further reading
Brett, Martin. "John of Worcester and his contemporaries." In The Writing of History in the Middle Ages: Essays Presented to R.W. Southern, ed. by R.H.C. Davis and J.M. Wallace Hadrill. Oxford: Oxford University Press, 1981. 101-26.
Brett, Martin, "John, monk of Worcester." In The Blackwell Encyclopedia of Anglo-Saxon England, ed. Michael Lapidge, et al. Oxford: Blackwell, 1999. 
Gransden, Antonia. Historical writing in England c. 550 to 1307. Vol 1. London, 1974. 143–8.
O'Donnell, Thomas. "Identities in Community: Literary Culture and Memory at Worcester." In Constructing History Across the Norman Conquest: Worcester, c.1050-c.1150, ed. by Francesca Tinti and D. A. Woodman. York: York Medieval Press, 2022. 31-60.
Orderic Vitalis, Historia Ecclesiastica, ed. and tr. Marjorie Chibnall, The Ecclesiastical History of Orderic Vitalis. 6 volumes. Oxford Medieval Texts. Oxford, 1968–1980. .

1140s deaths
Year of birth unknown

Year of death uncertain
12th-century English historians

English Christian monks
English chroniclers
Writers from Worcester, England
English male non-fiction writers
12th-century Latin writers
12th-century English writers
12th-century astronomers